The Lincoln was a cyclecar or light car built in Detroit, Michigan by the Lincoln Motor Car Company in 1914.

History 
The Lincoln Motor Car Company was a name changing  from the American Motorette Company. Like the American Voiturette Company it were set-up by former Keeton officials. The car was called the Lincoln Highway.

The Highway Model was a brass era roadster with seating for three passengers, one sitting in front of the driver. The body used a Renault style hood on a 100-inch wheelbase. Production was very limited.

References

 

Defunct motor vehicle manufacturers of the United States
Motor vehicle manufacturers based in Michigan
Defunct manufacturing companies based in Michigan
Brass Era vehicles
1910s cars
Cyclecars
Vehicle manufacturing companies established in 1914
Vehicle manufacturing companies disestablished in 1914
Cars introduced in 1914